The Greatest Hits Collection II  is the second compilation album by American country music duo Brooks & Dunn. It is the sequel to the duo's 1997 compilation The Greatest Hits Collection. It is also the second collection of the duo's most popular releases, chronicling their greatest hits from 1998's If You See Her, 2001's Steers & Stripes, and 2003's Red Dirt Road, omitting songs from 1999's Tight Rope. It also features one song from 1994's Waitin' on Sundown and one song from 1996's Borderline, both of which did not make it to the first compilation. Three new recorded tracks — "That's What It's All About", "It's Getting Better All The Time", and "Independent Trucker" — are also included on this compilation. These first two songs were released as singles, peaking at #2 and #1, respectively, on the Billboard Hot Country Songs chart. The CD version is currently out of print; however, it is available from digital and streaming services.

Track listing

ANew Recorded Tracks.

BPreviously Unreleased

Personnel on new tracks
Brooks & Dunn
Kix Brooks – lead vocals, background vocals
Ronnie Dunn – lead vocals, background vocals

Additional musicians
David Angell – violin
Bekka Bramlett – background vocals
Mike Brignardello – bass guitar
Perry Coleman – background vocals
J. T. Corenflos – electric guitar
Chad Cromwell – drums
Eric Darken – percussion
David Davidson – violin
Dan Dugmore – steel guitar
Kim Fleming – background vocals
Larry Franklin – fiddle, mandolin
Kenny Greenberg – electric guitar
Wes Hightower – background vocals
Anthony LaMarchina – cello
Steve Nathan – piano
Sarighandi D. Reist – cello
John Wesley Ryles – background vocals
Crystal Taliefero – background vocals
Kristin Wilkinson – string arrangements, viola
John Willis – acoustic guitar, mandolin
Glenn Worf – bass guitar
Reese Wynans – Hammond organ, piano

Chart performance

Weekly charts

Year-end charts

References

2004 greatest hits albums
Brooks & Dunn albums
Arista Records compilation albums